Uranium bromide may refer to:

Uranium tetrabromide, UBr4
Uranium pentabromide, UBr5